Braulio Rubén Tupaj Amaru Grajeda Fuentes is a writer also known as Leo Zelada. He was born in 1970 and lives in Madrid, Spain.

Biography 

Zelada studied philosophy at San Marcos University of Peru and he was on charge of a poetical workshop called "Carpe Diem". He used to publish articles and writings in the most important newspapers of Latin America, such as El Peruano.

From 1983 to 1998 he traveled all over Latin America just with his backpack. He passed the Andes, the Amazons, the Darien, the Caribbeans and Chiapas, and finally he arrived at Los Angeles, United States of America. He has traveled throughout America and Europe, having Spain as his country of residence. He coordinates La Tertulia Literaria Exiles in Madrid. Colaborador of the newspaper Madridpress.

In May 2013, Vimeo and YouTube released a documentary short titled "Leo Zelada. Underground Poet", held in Madrid, by the Spanish audiovisual producer, Amagifilms.

Zelada won in February 2015 the Prize Poets of Other Worlds, granted by the International Poetic Fund of Spain.

Much of his work is in the National Library of Spain in Madrid.

His book Transpoética was published in Madrid in 2016 by Vaso Roto Ediciones. In February 2019 his novel El Último Nómada was published in Spain.

In January 2021, the documentary "Leo Zelada: Transpoética" was released on You Tube, a road movie with a musical background of trap, ethnic and electronic music. It has English and French subtitles. The documentary was pre-premiered in Madrid, on January 5, 2021.

In March 2022, an anthology of all his poetic work titled "Transpoetique" was released in Paris, France, under the Unicite Editions label. He has performed several poetry recitals in Paris, the last one on June 22, 2022, at the prestigious Maison de l'Amérique latine in Paris.

Works

Poetry

Delirium Tremens (Lima, Perú, 1998).
Journal of a Cyber-Punk D.F. (Mexico, 2001).
Nosferatu's booklet about to dawn (Lima, Perú 2005).
The Way of the Dragon (Madrid, España, 2008).
Minimal Poética (Madrid, España, Vaso Roto Ediciones, 2010).
Transpoética (Madrid, España, Vaso Roto Ediciones, 2016).
Transpoetique, Poetic Anthology(Unicite Editions, France, 2022)

Novels

American Death of Life (Lima, 2005).
El Último Nómada (Madrid, España, Ruleta Rusa Ediciones, 2019).

Translations

Poetic Anthology of the Inca Empire (Madrid, España, 2007).

Anthologies

 Literary Anthology of the Baquiana Magazine (La Florida, United States, Baquiana Editions, 2001).
 Maratón de Escritores (Madrid, España, Ediciones Netwriter, 2011)
 Anthology Yearbook of Baquiana (Florida, United States, Editions Baquiana, 2002).
 Bukowski Club 2006-08. Jam session of poetry (Madrid, Spain, Editions Escalera, 2008).
 Marathon of Writers (Madrid, Spain, Ediciones Netwriter, 2011).
 Bukowski Club. Anthology Poetics (Madrid, Spain, Canalla Ediciones, 2011).

Compiler

 Contemporary Peruvian poetry: Neon: Poems without limits of speed: poetic anthology, 1990–2003 (Lima, Perú, 2003).
 Beyond the Boom: New Ibero-American Narrative (Madrid, España, 2007).
New Poetry and Hispanic American Narrative (Madrid, España, 2011).
Current Hispanoamerican Poetry (Madrid,España, 2017).

References

External links 
Xelada's blog in Spain
Website from the US

20th-century Peruvian poets
1970 births
Living people
Peruvian male poets
21st-century Peruvian poets
Peruvian emigrants to Spain
20th-century male writers
21st-century male writers